The KwaZulu-Natal North Coast (better known as the Dolphin Coast, the KZN North Coast or just the North Coast) is a region on the northern coast of KwaZulu-Natal, South Africa. It stretches from Thukela Mouth in the north to Ballito in the south. The coast is governed by the iLembe District Municipality.

Its main towns are Ballito, Salt Rock and KwaDukuza. As of 2011 the KwaZulu-Natal North Coast has a population of 231,187 (KwaDukuza Local Municipality which excludes Thukela Mouth).

Geography 
It is bordered by the Indian Ocean on the east, Zululand in the north, the KwaZulu-Natal Midlands in the west and eThekwini to the south.

The coastline between Westbrook and uMhlanga is sometimes regarded part of the North Coast however according to Tourism KZN (government agency for tourism in KwaZulu-Natal), the KwaZulu-Natal North Coast starts officially from Thukela Mouth in the north to Ballito in the south.

Administration 
The region is governed by the KwaDukuza Local Municipality and Mandeni Local Municipality which are part of the larger iLembe District Municipality. The KwaDukuza Local Municipality has its seat in KwaDukuza whilst Mandeni Local Municipality has its seat in Mandeni which is not part of the North Coast.

 KwaDukuza Local Municipality governs Ballito, Salt Rock, Sheffield Beach, Umhlali, Shakaskraal, Tinley Manor Beach, KwaDukuza, Blythedale Beach, Zinkwazi Beach
 Mandeni Local Municipality governs Thukela/Tugela Mouth

Economy 
The towns of Ballito and KwaDukuza are the primary commercial hub in the North Coast.
The North Coast (including uMhlanga) has seen a massive development boom over the recent years especially Ballito which has been growing exponentially with new developments such as new shopping centres, other retail outlets, private schools, a private hospital and new gated residential estate. The small resort village of Salt Rock just north of Shaka's Rock has also seen growth with recent developments such as the Tiffany's and Salt Rock City shopping centres and the Curro Mount Richmore private school. KwaDukuza has also seen growth with the recent development of the KwaDukuza Mall which opened in 2018.

KwaDukuza is the administrative centre of the North Coast and includes the head offices of the KwaDukuza Local Municipality and iLembe District Municipality. There is also a Magistrate's court and the Department of Home Affairs and the South African Social Security Agency (SASSA) have regional offices in KwaDukuza.

Facilities

Public Hospitals 

 General Justice Gizenga Mpanza Regional Hospital, KwaDukuza

Private Hospitals 

 Netcare Alberlito Hospital, Ballito
KwaDukuza Private Hospital, KwaDukuza

Golfing 

This is a list of golf courses on the KwaZulu-Natal North Coast:

 Prince's Grant Golf Course, Prince's Grant Golf Estate
 Simbithi Country Club, Ballito
 Umhlali Country Club, Ballito
 Zimbali Country Club, Ballito

Tourism 

The North Coast has always been popular with anglers because the fishing is so good. This may be due to the many sheltered lagoons which open into the Indian Ocean and which serve as nurseries for small fish and other sea creatures. The area is also known for its good surf and the internationally recognized Mr Price Pro-surfing contest, which draws competitors from all over the world, is held in Ballito annually.

Outside the domestic holiday season and long-weekends, many of these places are quiet, however, during the seasonal holiday influx, the many holiday homes, excellent restaurants and nightclubs fill up and so do the beaches and many other attractions along the coast.

Tourist attractions along the North Coast include:

 Ballito & North Coast Microflight Flights
 Ballito Ski Park
 Clubventure
 Crocodile Creek
 Flag Animal Farm
 Granny's Pool
 Harold Johnson Nature Reserve
 Hole-in-the-wall
 Holla Trails
 King Shaka Memorial
 Luthuli Museum
 Monkeyland KZN
 Ndlondlo Reptile Par.k
 North Coast Venoumous Snake Park
 Salt Rock Tidal Pool
 Sugar Rush Park
 Thompson Bay Rock Pool

Towns 

 Ballito
 Blythedale Beach
Darnall
Groutville
 KwaDukuza
 Salt Rock
 Shakaskraal
 Shaka's Rock
 Sheffield Beach
 Thukela Mouth
 Tinley Manor Beach
 Umhlali
 Zinkwazi Beach

Transport

Road 
The North Coast is connected by the N2, R74, R102 and M4.

 The N2 connects to Richards Bay, Empangeni and Ermelo in the north and Durban, Port Shepstone, East London, Port Elizabeth and Cape Town in the south-west
 The R102 connects to oThongathi, Verulam and Durban in the south-west and Empangeni in the north.
 The R74 connects to Greytown, Colenso, Bergville and Harrismith
 The M4 connects to Westbrook, eMdloti, uMhlanga and Durban.

The N2 runs parallel to the coast from south to north along with the M4 and R102.

The "North Coast Toll Road" situated on the N2 passes through the region and begins at the King Shaka International Airport near Durban in the south-west and ends in Mtunzini in the Zululand region in the north-east. The Mvoti Toll Plaza near KwaDukuza is the only mainstream toll plaza within the North Coast.

An alternative route to the toll road (N2) for travellers heading north-east towards Empangeni or south-west towards uMhlanga and Durban is the R102 and the M4 from Ballito.

Air 

The North Coast is served by the King Shaka International Airport, north of Durban which has flights to domestic destinations such as Johannesburg, Cape Town, Gqeberha, East London, Bloemfontein, Mbombela and George and international destinations such as Doha, Dubai, Istanbul and Harare.

Media 
The newspapers in the KZN North Coast are the North Coast Courier Stanger Weekly and The Bugle. In terms of radio, East Coast Radio and Ukhozi FM are the main radio stations mainly serving the whole province of KwaZulu-Natal.

References 

Geography of KwaZulu-Natal
Coasts of South Africa